A. pudica may refer to:

 Alstroemeria pudica, a plant species in the genus Alstroemeria
 Aorangia pudica, a spider species in the genus Aorangia

See also
 Pudica